Punter may refer to:

Personal roles 
 Punter (card game), person who lays bets in a banking game
 Punter (football), a position in American or Canadian football
 Someone who uses a punt (boat)
 Punter, a Puntite
 Client (prostitution), in British English
 Gambler, in Australian and New Zealand English

People 
 Punter (surname)
 Punter Humphreys (1881–1949), English cricketer
 Ricky Ponting (born 1974), nicknamed Punter, Australian cricketer

Other uses 
 Punter (protocol), a file-transfer protocol
 Punternet, an escort rating service

See also 
 Punt (disambiguation)
 Punta (disambiguation)